Qi Yu (born April 1961) is a Chinese politician serving since 2015 as the deputy head of the Organization Department of the Chinese Communist Party. Qi was formerly a provincial official in Jilin and Qinghai provinces.

Qi was born in Wuqi County, Shaanxi province. He joined the Chinese Communist Party in December 1982. He graduated from Northwest University of Politics and Law with a degree in philosophy, and later obtained a graduate degree from the Central Party School.  He began his work in the Organization Department of the Shaanxi provincial party committee, then was named editor at Party Building Research, a publication of the Organization Department of the Chinese Communist Party.  He was elevated to editor-in-chief of the publication in 2001. He also briefly served as the deputy party chief of Taiyuan.  In November 2007, he was named Organization Department head of Qinghai province and a member of the provincial Party Standing Committee.

In May 2013, Qi was named head of the provincial Organization Department of Jilin. He was named deputy head of the Organization Department of the Chinese Communist Party in December 2015. In January 2019, he was named Party Secretary of the Ministry of Foreign Affairs.

References 

People from Yan'an
1961 births
People's Republic of China politicians from Shaanxi
Living people
Northwest University of Politics and Law alumni